The King in Yellow is a book of short stories by the American writer Robert W. Chambers, first published by F. Tennyson Neely in 1895. The book is named for the fictional play with the same title which recurs as a motif through some of the stories. The first half of the book features highly esteemed horror stories, and the book has been described by critics such as E. F. Bleiler and T. E. D. Klein as a classic in the field of the supernatural. Lin Carter called it "an absolute masterpiece, probably the single greatest book of weird fantasy written in this country between the death of Poe and the rise of Lovecraft".

There are 10 stories, the first four of which ("The Repairer of Reputations", "The Mask", "In the Court of the Dragon", and "The Yellow Sign") mention The King in Yellow, a forbidden play which induces despair or madness in those who read it. "The Yellow Sign" inspired a film of the same name released in 2001.

The British first edition was published by Chatto & Windus in 1895 (316 pages).

Stories
The first four stories are loosely connected by three main devices:

 A play in book form entitled The King in Yellow
 A mysterious and malevolent supernatural and gothic entity known as the King in Yellow
 An eerie symbol called the Yellow Sign

These stories are macabre in tone, centering, in keeping with the other tales, on characters who are often artists or decadents, inhabitants of the demi-monde.

The first and fourth stories, "The Repairer of Reputations" and "The Yellow Sign", are set in an imagined future 1920s America, whereas the second and third stories, "The Mask" and "In the Court of the Dragon", are set in Paris. These stories are haunted by the theme: "Have you found the Yellow Sign?"

The macabre character gradually fades away during the remaining stories, and the last three are written in the romantic fiction style common to Chambers' later work. They are all linked to the preceding stories by their Parisian setting and their artistic protagonists.

List of stories

The stories in the book are:
 "The Repairer of Reputations" – a story of egotism and paranoia which carries the imagery of the book's title.
 "The Mask" – a dream story of art, love, and uncanny science.
 "In the Court of the Dragon" – a man is pursued by a sinister church organist who is after his soul.
 "The Yellow Sign" – an artist is troubled by a sinister churchyard watchman who resembles a coffin worm.
 "The Demoiselle d'Ys" – a time travel love story.
 "The Prophets' Paradise" – a sequence of eerie prose poems that develop the style and theme of a quote from the fictional play The King in Yellow which introduces "The Mask".
 "The Street of the Four Winds" – an atmospheric tale of an artist in Paris who is drawn to a neighbor's room by a cat; the story ends with a tragic touch.
 "The Street of the First Shell" – a war story set in the Paris Siege of 1870.
 "The Street of Our Lady of the Fields" – romantic American bohemians in Paris.
 "Rue Barrée" – romantic American bohemians in Paris, with a discordant ending that playfully reflects some of the tone of the first story.

The play called The King in Yellow
The fictional play The King in Yellow has at least two acts and at least three characters: Cassilda, Camilla and "the Stranger", who may or may not be the titular character.

Chambers' story collection excerpts some sections from the play to introduce the book as a whole, or individual stories. For example, "Cassilda's Song" comes from Act 1, Scene 2 of the play:

The short story "The Mask" is introduced by an excerpt from Act 1, Scene 2d:

It is also stated, in "The Repairer of Reputations", that the final moment of the first act involves the character Camilla's "agonized scream and...awful words echoing through the dim streets of Carcosa".

All of the excerpts come from Act I. The stories describe Act I as quite ordinary, but reading Act II drives the reader mad with the "irresistible" revealed truths: "The very banality and innocence of the first act only allowed the blow to fall afterward with more awful effect". Even seeing the first page of the second act is enough to draw the reader in: "If I had not caught a glimpse of the opening words in the second act I should never have finished it [...]" ("The Repairer of Reputations").

Chambers usually gives only scattered hints of the contents of the full play, as in this extract from "The Repairer of Reputations":

He mentioned the establishment of the Dynasty in Carcosa, the lakes which connected Hastur, Aldebaran and the mystery of the Hyades. He spoke of Cassilda and Camilla, and sounded the cloudy depths of Demhe, and the Lake of Hali. "The scolloped tatters of the King in Yellow must hide Yhtill forever", he muttered, but I do not believe Vance heard him. Then by degrees he led Vance along the ramifications of the Imperial family, to Uoht and Thale, from Naotalba and Phantom of Truth, to Aldones, and then tossing aside his manuscript and notes, he began the wonderful story of the Last King.

A similar passage occurs in "The Yellow Sign", in which two protagonists have read The King in Yellow:

Night fell and the hours dragged on, but still we murmured to each other of the King and the Pallid Mask, and midnight sounded from the misty spires in the fog-wrapped city. We spoke of Hastur and of Cassilda, while outside the fog rolled against the blank window-panes as the cloud waves roll and break on the shores of Hali.

Inspirations for The King in Yellow
Chambers borrowed the names Carcosa, Hali and Hastur from Ambrose Bierce: specifically, his short stories "An Inhabitant of Carcosa" and "Haïta the Shepherd". There is no strong indication that Chambers was influenced beyond liking the names. For example, Hastur is a god of shepherds in "Haïta the Shepherd", but is implicitly a location in "The Repairer of Reputations", listed alongside the Hyades and Aldebaran.
The Mask that the Stranger is instructed to remove but turns out not to exist at all in the excerpt from The King in Yellow play (in Chambers' short story "The Mask") evokes the scene in Edgar Allan Poe's "The Masque of the Red Death" where Prince Prospero demands that the stranger dressed as the Red Death should remove his mask and robes, only to find nothing underneath. Given the recognition of that short story, this might be an inspiration or even a tribute from Chambers to Poe.

Brian Stableford has pointed out that the story "The Demoiselle d'Ys" was influenced by the stories of Théophile Gautier, such as "Arria Marcella" (1852); both Gautier and Chambers' stories feature a love affair enabled by a supernatural time slip.

Influence
The first season of HBO's True Detective television series (2014) revolves around a string of crimes committed by or associated with the elusive "Yellow King", a member of an elite Cajun/Creole cult that appear to have formed their rituals and worship through melding of various elements of folk Catholicism, voudon, and elements from Chambers' book. Carcosa is mentioned on numerous occasions; it is later revealed as a former fortress and pirate hideout containing a human skeleton clad in yellow robes. Black stars are also prominent in reference and imagery during the series.

Cthulhu Mythos

H. P. Lovecraft read The King in Yellow in early 1927
and included passing references to various things and places from the book — such as the Lake of Hali and the Yellow Sign — in "The Whisperer in Darkness" (1931),
one of his main Cthulhu Mythos stories. Lovecraft borrowed Chambers' method of only vaguely referring to supernatural events, entities, and places, thereby allowing his readers to imagine the horror for themselves. The play The King in Yellow effectively became another piece of occult literature in the Cthulhu Mythos alongside the Necronomicon and others.

Lords of Dûs
The King in Yellow also inspired an enigmatic character who appeared in all four books in Lawrence Watt-Evans’ Lords of Dûs series.

SCP Foundation
The King in Yellow was taken as inspiration for the SCP Foundation story SCP-701 - The Hanged King's Tragedy (2009). SCP-701 is a Caroline era revenge tragedy titled The Hanged King's Tragedy set in the Kingdom of Trinculo, a fictionalized Kingdom of Trinacria. In roughly 40% of cases, performances are derailed by SCP-701-1 (a being identified by the cast as the Ambassador of Alagadda, an agent of the Hanged King) whose involvement causes the actors to commit murder-suicide and the audience to riot in insanity. SCP-701 was adapted into a chapter for the indie game SCP: Secret Files released as a demo for Steam Next Fest.

Other games 
Hastur from The King in Yellow was the inspiration for the character Estir (also known as 'the King in Yellow', 'the Unspeakable One', and 'She Who is Not to be Named') in Sucker for Love: First Date, a Lovecraft-inspired dating simulator. In the 2022 game SIGNALIS, the book is featured as a literary reference. In the card game Fhtagn Simulator, The King in Yellow is referenced on a number of cards.

Podcasts
The central antagonist of the podcast "Malevolent" is The King in Yellow, an eldritch being that creates madness in the minds of the vulnerable.

Music 
The King in Yellow is a direct inspiration of the song composed by the artist named KIKWAJU. The lyrics from his song titled "Carcosa: Le Roi en Jaune" are taken, in part, from "Cassilda's Song".<ref>The song Carcosa: Le Roi en Jaune on Kikwaju's bandcamp|url=https://www.kikwaju.bandcamp.com/track/carcosa-le-roi-en-jaune</ref>

References

Further reading
 
 
 The Hastur Cycle, edited by Robert M. Price, Chaosium, 1993
 The Yellow Sign and Other Stories, edited by S.T. Joshi, Chaosium, 2004
 Rehearsals for Oblivion: Act 1 - Tales of The King in Yellow, edited by Peter A. Worthy, Elder Signs Press, 2007
 Strange Aeons 3 (an issue dedicated to The King in Yellow, edited by Rick Tillman and K.L. Young, Autumn 2010
 A Season in Carcosa, edited by Joseph S. Pulver, Miskatonic River Press, 2012
 New Tales of the Yellow Sign by Robin D. Laws, Atomic Overmind Press, 2012
 Lovecraft eZine King in Yellow Tribute Issue, edited by Joseph S. Pulver, Lovecraft eZine Press, 2014
 Cassilda's Song: Tales Inspired by Robert W. Chambers' King in Yellow Mythos, edited by Joseph S. Pulver, Chaosium, 2015
 The King in Yellow Tales: Volume 1 by Joseph S. Pulver, Lovecraft eZine Press, 2015
 The Egg'' by Hildred Rex, 2017

External links

 
 
 The King in Yellow at sff.net
 
 "The King in Yellow": An Introduction by Christophe Thill
 
 The King in Yellow: In the Court of the Dragon audiobook with video at YouTube
 The King in Yellow: In the Court of the Dragon audiobook at Libsyn

1895 short story collections
American short story collections
Chatto & Windus books
Fictional plays
Horror short story collections
Gothic short stories
Books adapted into films